The Beinecke Rare Book & Manuscript Library is the rare book library and literary archive of the Yale University Library in New Haven, Connecticut.  It is one of the largest buildings in the world dedicated to rare books and manuscripts. Established by a gift of the Beinecke family and given its own financial endowment, the library is financially independent from the university and is co-governed by the University Library and Yale Corporation.

Situated on Yale University's Hewitt Quadrangle, the building was designed by Gordon Bunshaft of Skidmore, Owings & Merrill and completed in 1963. From 2015 to 2016 the library building was closed for 18 months for major renovations, which included replacing the building's HVAC system and expanding teaching and exhibition capabilities.

Architecture
A six-story above-ground glass-enclosed tower of book stacks is encased by a windowless façade, supported by four monolithic piers at the corners of the building. The exterior shell is structurally supported by a steel frame with pylons embedded  to bedrock at each corner pier. The façade is constructed of translucent veined marble and granite. On a sunny day the marble transmits filtered daylight to the interior in a subtle golden amber glow, a product of its thin profile. These panels are framed by a hexagonal grid of Vermont Woodbury granite veneer, fastened  to a structural steel frame. The outside dimensions have "Platonic" mathematical proportions of 1:2:3 (height: width: length). The building has been called a "jewel box", and also a "laboratory for the humanities". The Modernist structure contains furniture designed by Florence Knoll and Marcel Breuer.

An elevated public exhibition mezzanine surrounds the glass stack tower, and displays among other things, one of the 48 extant copies of the Gutenberg Bible. Two basement floors extend under much of Hewitt Quadrangle. The first sub-grade level, the "Court" level, centers on a sunken courtyard in front of the Beinecke, which features The Garden (Pyramid, Sun, and Cube).  These are abstract allegorical sculptures by Isamu Noguchi that are said to represent time (the pyramid), sun (the disc), and chance (the cube).  This level also features a secure reading room for visiting researchers, administrative offices, and book storage areas. The level of the building two floors below ground has movable-aisle high-density shelving for books and archives.

The Beinecke is one of the larger buildings in America devoted entirely to rare books and manuscripts. The library has room in the central tower for 180,000 volumes and room for over 1 million volumes in the underground book stacks. The library's collection, which is housed both in the library's main building and at Yale University's Library Shelving Facility in Hamden, Connecticut, totals roughly 1 million volumes and several million manuscripts.

During the 1960s, the Claes Oldenburg sculpture Lipstick on Caterpillar Tracks (Ascending) was displayed in Hewitt Quadrangle. The sculpture has since been moved to the courtyard of Morse College, one of the university's residential dormitories.

The elegance of the Beinecke later inspired the glass-walled structure that protects and displays the original core collection (the books given by King George III and referred to as the King's Library) within the British Library building in Euston, London.

History

In the late 19th century, rare and valuable books of the Library of Yale College were placed on special shelving at the College Library, now known as Dwight Hall. When the university received a multimillion-dollar bequest from John W. Sterling for the construction of Sterling Memorial Library in 1918, the university decided to create a dedicated reading room for its rare books, which became the building's Rare Book Room when the building opened in 1930. Because the bequest did not contain an allowance for books or materials, Yale English professor Chauncey Brewster Tinker petitioned Yale alumni to donate materials that would give the university a collection as monumental as its new building. By the time Sterling opened, Tinker's appeal garnered an impressive collection of rare books, including a Gutenberg Bible from Anna M. Harkness and several major collections from the Beinecke family, most notably its collection on the American West.

By 1958, the library owned more than 130,000 rare volumes and many more manuscripts. The amassed collection proved too large for Sterling's reading room, and the reading room unsuited to their preservation. Having already given significant collections to Yale, Edwin and Frederick W. Beinecke—as well as Johanna Weigle, widow of their brother Walter—gave funds to build a dedicated rare books library building. When the Beinecke Library opened on October 14, 1963, it became the home of the volumes from Rare Book Room, and three special collections: the Collection of American Literature, the Collection of Western Americana, and the Collection of German Literature. Shortly afterward, they were joined by the James Marshall and Marie-Louise Osborn Collection.

Beinecke Library became the repository for books in the Yale collection printed anywhere before 1800, books printed in Latin America before 1751, books printed in North America before 1821, newspapers and broadsides printed in the United States before 1851, European tracts and pamphlets printed before 1801, and Slavic, East European, Near and Middle Eastern books through the eighteenth century, as well as special books outside these categories.

Now, the collection spans through to the present day, including such modern works as limited-edition poetry and artists' books. The library also contains thousands of linear feet of archival material, ranging from ancient papyri and medieval manuscripts to the archived personal papers of modern writers.

Special collections

The library is open to all Yale University students and faculty, and to visiting researchers whose work requires use of its special collections. In order to access materials, there are a few forms and policies that users must read.

The holdings of the Beinecke Library include:

American Children's Literature
John James Audubon
James M. Barrie
John Baskerville
William Thomas Beckford
Sir John Betjeman
John Boswell
Joseph Brodsky
Bryher
Mary Butts
Rachel Carson
Cartography, including the "Vinland Map"
Cary Collection of Playing Cards
Ernst Cassirer
Congregationalism
Joseph Conrad
Walter Crane
Dada
The d'Aulaire Collection (Ingri and Edgar Parin d'Aulaire)
Daniel Defoe
Charles Dickens
Norman Douglas
Lawrence Durrell
Jonathan Edwards
George Eliot
The Elizabethan Club collection
Erasmus and his contemporaries
Faust
Fantasy Magazine Archives
Henry Fielding
Benjamin Franklin
Goethe
George Grosz
Greek and Latin literature
Thomas Hardy
H.D. Papers
W. Head & Sister, photographers
Langston Hughes
Humanism
Incunabula (over 3100 volumes including the Melk copy of the Gutenberg Bible)
James Weldon Johnson Collection
James Joyce
Judaica
Rudyard Kipling
D. H. Lawrence
Doris Lessing
Sinclair Lewis
Pre-1600 manuscripts 
Thomas Mann
F.T. Marinetti
John Masefield
F. O. Matthiessen
The Mellon Collection of Alchemy and the Occult
George Meredith
William J. Minor Horse Racing Papers.
Eugene O'Neill, Jr.
Ornithology
the Papyrus Collection
Polish Literature
Pop-up books and movable books
Ezra Pound Papers
Dorothy Richardson
Rilke
Rochambeau Family
Bruce Rogers
the Romanov Family photo albums
Olga Rudge Papers
John Ruskin
Russian Literature
Schiller
Miriam Schlein
Sixteenth-Century Printed Books
Sporting Books
The Gertrude Stein and Alice B. Toklas Collection
Robert Louis Stevenson
James J. Strang
Alexis de Tocqueville
Vanderbilt Collection
Carl Van Vechten
Paula Vogel
The Voynich manuscript
Rebecca West
Edith Wharton
The Thornton Wilder papers
Kurt Wolff

Exhibitions

In addition to items on permanent display such as the Gutenberg Bible, the Beinecke offers a year-round program of temporary exhibits drawn from its collections. For example, in 2006 the library presented Breaking the Binding: Printing and the Third Dimension, a show of flap books, pop-ups, perspective books, panoramas, and peep-shows in printed form. Display cases are located on the mezzanine level and at the ground floor entry level, and may be freely viewed by the general public whenever the library is open.

The Library celebrated its 50th anniversary in 2013. There were two full-year exhibitions that explored the library's architecture and people as well as a series of showcases of rarely seen manuscripts, printed works, and visual objects from across all curatorial areas.

Security
The Beinecke collection does not circulate; all materials are to be consulted in the reading room. The library hosts almost 10,000 research visits annually, almost half of which are with scholars having no formal affiliation to Yale University.

Security measures were significantly increased after the well-known antiques dealer Edward Forbes Smiley III was caught cutting maps from rare books with an X-acto blade in 2005. Smiley's scheme was discovered when he dropped his concealed tool in the reading room, and he subsequently served several years in prison for thefts of rare documents valued in millions of dollars from the Beinecke and other libraries. The library operates under a closed stack system, and rigorous security rules now allow carefully controlled access to materials under video surveillance.

The glass-enclosed central stacks (not accessible to the public) can be flooded with a mix of Halon 1301 and Inergen fire suppressant gas if fire detectors are triggered. A previous system using carbon dioxide was removed for personnel safety reasons.

All new acquisitions are given this treatment as a precaution, and the deep freeze method is now widely accepted for pest control in special collections libraries.

In popular culture
In Uncommon Carriers, John McPhee admires a restaurant's display of "a glass tower of recumbent wines that may have been an architectural reference to the glass column of visible books in the Beinecke Library at Yale".
In The Once and Future Spy by Robert Littell, an assassination attempt is made on a CIA analyst at the Beinecke Library.
In The Ninth House, the Beinecke Library is made a site for cult practice by Manuscript Society.

See also 
 Papyrus Oxyrhynchus 216
 Papyrus Oxyrhynchus 219
 Papyrus Oxyrhynchus 276
 Voynich manuscript

Notes

References

Further reading

External links

 Beinecke renovation website
 Online Tour of the Beinecke Library Building
 African American Studies at Beinecke Library Blog
 Beinecke Poetry Blog
 Room 26: Cabinet of Curiosities Blog – Blog of visual materials from the Beinecke's collections by Beinecke curatorial staff
 Beinecke Library Construction Photographs, 1961–1963
 Beinecke Rare Book and Manuscript Library Exhibition Materials. General Collection, Beinecke Rare Book and Manuscript Library, Yale University.
 

Library buildings completed in 1963
Yale University buildings
Yale University Library
Skidmore, Owings & Merrill buildings
Modernist architecture in Connecticut
Literary archives in the United States
Rare book libraries in the United States
Special collections libraries in the United States